Matthew Robert Field  is a British diplomat. He joined HM Diplomatic Service in 2003. Between August 2018 and June 2022 he has served as the British Ambassador to Bosnia and Herzegovina. In January 2023 he took up the post of ambassador to the Czech Republic.

Field was appointed Officer of the Order of the British Empire (OBE) in the 2023 New Year Honours for services to British foreign policy.

References

 

Ambassadors of the United Kingdom to Bosnia and Herzegovina
Ambassadors of the United Kingdom to the Czech Republic
21st-century British diplomats
Year of birth missing (living people)
Living people
Alumni of Van Mildert College, Durham
Officers of the Order of the British Empire